Azaria Alon (15 November 1918 – 19 January 2014) was an Israel Prize-winning environmentalist, and a co-founder of the Society for the Protection of Nature in Israel (SPNI).

Biography
Azaria Alon was born in Ukraine. His family immigrated to Palestine in 1925, settling on Kfar Yehezkel, a moshav in the Jezreel Valley. They moved to Kiryat Haim in 1932, the year in which he graduated from the Hebrew Reali School. Alon returned to the Jezreel Valley at the age of 20 to live on Kibbutz Beit HaShita. In 1952, he married Reut, with whom he had four children.

Awards and recognition 
Alon received an Israel Prize for lifetime achievement in 2012. He had previously been nominated for the Israel Prize when the SPNI won it in 1980.
Alon also entered the Guinness Book of World Records as the anchor of the oldest radio program.

Books
 Israel National Parks & Nature Reserves : a Carta Guide, (2014), Carta,

See also
List of Israel Prize recipients

References 

1918 births
2014 deaths
Israeli conservationists
Israeli Jews
Israel Prize for lifetime achievement & special contribution to society recipients
People from Haifa
Soviet emigrants to Mandatory Palestine
Ukrainian Jews
Hebrew Reali School alumni